The 2016–17 1. FSV Mainz 05 season is the 112th season in the football club's history and 8th consecutive and 11th overall season in the top flight of German football, the Bundesliga, having been promoted from the 2. Bundesliga in 2009. In addition to the domestic league, Mainz will also participate in this season's edition of the domestic cup, the DFB-Pokal. This will be the 6th season for the club in the Opel Arena, located in Mainz, Germany. The stadium has a capacity of 34,034. The season covers a period from 1 July 2016 to 30 June 2017.

Players

Squad

Competitions

Overview

Bundesliga

League table

Results summary

Results by round

Matches

DFB-Pokal

UEFA Europa League

Group stage

Statistics

Appearances and goals

|-
! colspan=14 style=background:#dcdcdc; text-align:center| Goalkeepers

|-
! colspan=14 style=background:#dcdcdc; text-align:center| Defenders

|-
! colspan=14 style=background:#dcdcdc; text-align:center| Midfielders

|-
! colspan=14 style=background:#dcdcdc; text-align:center| Forwards

|-
! colspan=14 style=background:#dcdcdc; text-align:center| Players transferred out during the season

Goalscorers

Last updated: 13 May 2017

Clean sheets

Last updated: 7 May 2017

Disciplinary record

Last updated: 20 May 2017

References

Mainz 05, 1. FSV
1. FSV Mainz 05 seasons
Mainz